The Victorian Open is an annual golf tournament held in Australia. It was founded in 1957 and is the Victoria state open championship for men. It is run by Golf Victoria and is a Golf Australia national ranking event.

The event is held concurrently with the Women's Victorian Open and offers equal prize pool for the two events. The tournament's tag line is: "Men and women. On the same course. At the same time. For equal prize money." The men and women play on the same course at the same time in alternating groups.

History
The first Victorian Open was played at Riversdale in 1957, replacing the Victorian Close Championship which had been first held in 1948. It was won by Ossie Pickworth who finished 10 strokes ahead of the field. Prize money was £250 but only one competitor, amateur Harry Hattersley, was from outside the state.

Three of the first four editions were won by Victorians with Gary Player winning 1959. However professionals from New South Wales won 9 of the 10 events from 1961 to 1970 with only Peter Thomson from Victoria breaking their run of success in 1968.

From 2004 to 2007 the tournament was part of the second-tier Von Nida Tour. It was not played in 2008 but from 2009 to 2016 it was a Tier 2 event on the PGA Tour of Australasia schedule. In 2017 it became a Tier 1 event.

Since 2012, it has been held concurrently with the Women's Victorian Open, being held at 13th Beach Golf Links in Barwon Heads, Victoria since 2013. When the tournament moved to 13th Beach Golf Links in 2013 the combined prize pool was $300,000, with $150,000 on offer for each of the men's and women's fields. In six years, the total prize pool has increased ten-fold. In 2019, the men's and women's Victorian Open fields played for a total purse of $3 million, $1.5 million for each event.

In 2019 and 2020, the event was co-sanctioned by the European Tour. The event continues to be played alongside the Women's Victorian Open, now co-sanctioned by the LPGA Tour. The event features a double cut, 65 players will remain after the first cut, then 35 players after the Saturday cut. In February 2019, James Nitties matched the world record of nine consecutive birdies in the Victorian Open. His birdie run from the 15th to the fifth in the first round set a European Tour record and matched Mark Calcavecchia's feat in the 2009 Canadian Open. David Law won the first co-sanctioned European Tour edition of the event. He won by a one stroke margin after entering the final three holes three strokes behind. Law birdied the 16th and eagled the final hole, this coupled with Wade Ormsby double bogeying his penultimate hole, led to Law claiming victory.

No event was played in 2021 due to the COVID-19 pandemic. The event returned in 2022 as a sole-sanctioned PGA Tour of Australasia event and had a reduced prize fund.

Winners

Source:

Notes

References

External links

Coverage on PGA Tour of Australasia's official site
Coverage on European Tour's official site

PGA Tour of Australasia events
Former European Tour events
Golf tournaments in Australia
Golf in Victoria (Australia)
Recurring sporting events established in 1957
1957 establishments in Australia